HMS Otus was an O-class submarine of the Royal Navy. She was laid down by Vickers-Armstrongs of Barrow-in-Furness on 31 May 1927, launched on 31 August 1928 and commissioned on 5 July 1929.

Service history
Otus was first commissioned for service with the 4th Submarine Flotilla on the China Station, and when the war broke out in 1939 she was deployed with the 1st Submarine Flotilla based at Alexandria with the Mediterranean Fleet. From July to December 1941 the submarine was based at Malta from where she carried out interception patrols with the 1st Flotilla.

On 14 August 1941 she was involved in a friendly fire incident, when the submarine  under the command of Lt.Cdr.

During 1943 she was transferred to Simonstown, South Africa for purposes of anti-submarine training.

During December 1944 she was nominated to be withdrawn from service. She was paid-off and transferred to Reserve status. During 1945 she was transferred to Durban, South Africa. Otus was scuttled off Durban in September 1946.

Discovery of the wreck

References

Bibliography
 

 

Odin-class submarines of the Royal Navy
1928 ships
Ships built in Barrow-in-Furness
World War II submarines of the United Kingdom